The Dandelion War is an American Post-Rock band from Oakland, California. Formed in 2008, the band is currently signed to Deep Elm Records. The band's debut album Geometries and Orchids was released independently in 2010. A follow-up, We Were Always Loyal to Lost Causes, was released by Deep Elm in 2012. Deep Elm also re-released Geometries and Orchids in 2012. The band's third album, Opposite Shores, was released on November 18, 2014.

Music 
The Dandelion War combines elements of post-rock and atmospheric indie music. The band's sound relies a stark contrasts between quiet minimalism and colossal crescendos. AbsolutePunk described the band as "sounding like what would happen if someone melted Explosions In The Sky, Radiohead and The Antlers’ Hospice together."  The Dandelion War has also been compared to Sigur Ros and My Morning Jacket.

The band reached critical acclaim with the release of We Were Always Loyal to Lost Causes in 2012. The album was listed as one of the year's top release by The Alternative Tone (#13), Team Reasonable (#10), and PopBlerd (#10).

Live Shows and Touring 
The Dandelion War has toured up and down the west coast since 2010 and has become a mainstay of the San Francisco Bay Area music scene. The band has opened for Imagine Dragons, Asobi Seksu, The Appleseed Cast, Cymbals Eat Guitars, and Caspian, among others.

In 2013, the band played San Francisco's acclaimed Noise Pop Festival.

Band members
 Larry Fernández - vocals
 Jeff Kay - guitar and keyboards
 Mikey Fuson - guitar
 Mario Roque - bass

Past Members:
 Julius Masibay - drums
 Chris Strebel - bass
 David Tran - keyboard

Discography 
 Geometries and Orchids (2010, self-released, 2012 re-issue by Deep Elm Records)
 We Were Always Loyal to Lost Causes (2012, Deep Elm Records)
 Opposite Shores (2014, self-released)

References 

American post-rock groups